Kaalam may refer to:

 Kaalam (novel), a 1970 novel by M. T. Vasudevan Nair
 Kaalam (1981 film), a Tamil-language Indian feature film
 Kaalam (1982 film), an Indian Malayalam film